William Nicol may refer to:

William Nicol (geologist) (1770–1851), Scottish physicist and geologist
William Nicol (surgeon) (1790–1879), Member of Parliament for Dover, 1859–1865
William Nicol (Transvaal) (1887–1967), clergyman and Governor of the Transvaal
William Nicol (teacher) (1744–1797), Scottish schoolmaster and friend of Robert Burns

See also
William Nicoll (disambiguation)
William Nichol (disambiguation)
William Nickle (disambiguation)